Clube Atlético Carazinho, commonly known as Atlético Carazinho, is a Brazilian football club based in Carazinho and part of state league competition in the state of Rio Grande do Sul.

History 
The club was founded on 1 July 1970 as a result of a merger between local rivals Grêmio Atlético Glória and Veterano Futebol Clube (both founded in 1933). They won the Campeonato do Interior Gaúcho in 1974 and the Série A2 in 1994.

Achievements 
 Série A2:
 Winners: 1994
 Campeonato do Interior Gaúcho:
 Winners: 1974

Stadium 
Clube Atlético Carazinho play their home games at Estádio Paulo Coutinho. The stadium has a maximum capacity of 10,000 people.

References 

Association football clubs established in 1970
Football clubs in Rio Grande do Sul
1970 establishments in Brazil